Sanchi Town is a Nagar panchayat, near Raisen town in Raisen District of the state of Madhya Pradesh, India, it is located  north east of Bhopal, and  from Besnagar or Vidisha in the central part of the state of Madhya Pradesh. Known for its "Sanchi Stupas", it is the location of several Buddhist monuments dating from the 3rd century BC to the 12th CE and is one of the important places of Buddhist pilgrimage.

Etymology of Sanchi
In Mahavamsa the site is referred to as Chetiyagiri, which was visited by Mahinda and his mother Devi. Early votive inscription refer to the place as Kakanaya. In the Gupta period it was termed Kakanada-Bota, and Bots-Shri-Parvat in the 7th century. A small hilltop village, just besides the stupa complex, is still called Kanakheda.

The name Sanchi might have originated from Sanskrit and Pali word  sanch meaning "to measure". In Hindi, however Sanchi or Sancha means "Moulds of Stones".

Demographics
 India census, Sanchi had a population of 6,785. Males constitute 53% of the population and females 47%. Sanchi has an average literacy rate of 67%, higher than the national average of 59.5%: male literacy is 75%, and to
female literacy is 57%. In Sanchi, 16% of the population is under 6 years of age.

Monuments at Sanchi

There are numerous monuments at Sanchi. The main are these, using the numbers assigned by Sir Alexander Cunningham, founder of the Archaeological Survey of India, who led excavations at Sanchi in 1854, which are still often used in the literature:
 The main terrace: Stupa 1 (Great Stupa), Stupa 3, Pillar 10 (Ashoka Pillar), Temple 18 (Mauryan apsidal), Temple 17 (Gupta).
 Eastern Area: Temple 45 (10th century CE).
 Southern Area: Temple 40 
 The western slope: Monastery 51 and Stupa
 The Archaeological Museum

Nearby Buddhist sites
Sanchi is one of a number of Buddhist sites in close vicinity of Vidisha. Other Buddhist complexes nearby are;
 Sonari
 Satdhara (the remains of Sariputta and Moglayan from here are now in Sanchi)
 Bhojpur
 Andher
All the sites are south of Vidisha. Some other Buddhist sites have been recently studied.

Buddhist University
On 11 September 2012, the Government of Madhya Pradesh announced the Sanchi University of Buddhist-Indic Studies, which is being built in collaboration with the government of Sri Lanka and Bhutan and will be located at Sanchi, in close proximity to the stupa. Designed by Sri Lankan architect SW Isurunath Bulankulame, the university will have various facilities, combined with a green landscape and usage of natural energy.

The foundation stone for the university was laid on 17 September 2012 by Sri Lankan president Mahinda Rajapaksa, Bhutan's Prime Minister Jigmi Yozyer Thinley, and Mahabodhi Society of Sri Lanka president Bangala Upatissa Nayaka Thero, amid high security due to a massive protest being organised by MDMK leader Vaiko against Rajapaksa, who had specially arrived in Madhya Pradesh with many protesters, but ultimately stopped.

References

Cities and towns in Raisen district